R. Krishnamoorthy was an Indian film director and screenwriter who worked on Tamil films. Most active in the 1980s, he is best known for directing Rajinikanth in Billa (1980) and Kamal Haasan in Vaazhvey Maayam (1982).

Career
Throughout his career, Krishnamoorthy regularly worked on productions by K. Balaji, Suresh Balaje and their Suresh Arts banner.

The success of the film Billa (1980) starring Rajinikanth, prompted the director to become widely dubbed as "Billa" Krishnamoorthy in the film industry. He later went on to collaborate again with Rajinikanth in Thee (1981), while making successful films such as Savaal (1981) and Vaazhvey Maayam (1982) with Kamal Haasan.

In the 1980s, he made several films with Sivaji Ganesan or his son Prabhu, including Neethibathi  (1983), Thiruppam (1984) and Nyaayam (1984).

Filmography
Director

References

External links

Tamil film directors
20th-century Indian film directors
Tamil-language film directors
Possibly living people
Year of birth missing